The Worry Website is a children's novel by Jacqueline Wilson published in 2002. It is illustrated by Nick Sharratt.

Summary 
There are seven stories about the children in a class taught by Mr Speed at Mapleton Juniors. The last story however, is about a girl called Natasha who talks through a machine, she doesn't actually go to Mapleton Juniors, she goes to a special school for disabled children. The Worry Website, a replacement of boring old Circle Time that is created by Mr Speed and you can only access it by Mr Speed's classroom computer.

There were originally planned to be only six stories, with one being submitted by a fan through a competition. However, the winning entry (Lisa's worry) ended so sadly that Wilson was motivated to write a seventh story to give the book a happier ending.

Holly: Worry 1 
Holly lives with her cute younger sister Hannah and her father. She thinks Hannah's Reception class teacher, Miss Morgan, is going to be her stepmother, as she has started dating her father. Holly wishes that her stepmother will be wicked. Holly likes Miss Morgan, but when she finds out that her father is dating with her, decides to loathe her. When they are dating, Holly spends more time with Miss Morgan, but never gives the teacher a chance to get on with her. Holly becomes foes with Miss Morgan, and then when they are going shopping together, Miss Morgan says she is getting sick of Holly behaving horrible to her. Then they both become best friends.

Greg: Worry 2 
Greg wants to sit next to Holly on the bus ride.

Claire: Worry 3 

Since she was a little girl, Claire has had nightmares after films so her mum has been very strict about what she watches. After watching the notorious 18-rated film The Monster, an extremely violent and gory film, she cannot get her mind off it when sleeping. Mr Speed gives her tips on how to get rid of her nightmares with her special skill, football, and the dream goes. She then gets a dream about her and Mr Speed playing a game of football together and defeating the monster.

William: Worry 4 

William is very unintelligent in everything. Mr Speed gives him a prize for losing a spelling contest. Later Mr Speed tells a story about an eating contest he once won when he was at school, called the Enormous Mouthful Contest, and then the children have their own contest, and William wins it.

Samantha: Worry 5 
Samantha's dad left her family and went off with his girlfriend. She has been very sad since then. Also she feels unpopular. Mr Speed suggests gardening which later attracts William to her and they garden very well.

Lisa: Worry 6 
Lisa's dad is an alcoholic. He beats her mum up. She is very sad to have this in her life. This is the only story that does not have a resolution, with Lisa deciding not to put her real worry down and say she is starting to get spots instead. However, the final chapter (Natasha's worry) partly continues Lisa's story as well.

Natasha: Worry 7 

Natasha, as said above, is disabled and uses a voice machine. She wants to be in the concert. She becomes friends with Lisa and they enter it with the worry song.

References 

2002 British novels
2002 children's books
Novels by Jacqueline Wilson
British children's novels
Doubleday (publisher) books
Novels set in high schools and secondary schools